Aspergillus sublatus (also named Apsergillus latus) is a species of fungus in the genus Aspergillus. It is from the Nidulantes section. The species was first described in 1979. It has been reported to produce asperthecin, nidulalin A, nidulalin B, and sterigmatocystin.

References 

sublatus
Fungi described in 1979